Aidan Price (born 8 December 1981) is an Irish former football player and currently head coach of Shamrock Rovers II.

Price played for Kilkenny City until the start of 2006 when he switched to Shamrock Rovers. He scored his first goal for the club on 7 June 2008 against Sligo Rovers and scored his first league goal in July 2009 against the same opposition. He spent five seasons with the club, winning promotion in his first and the League of Ireland title in his last. He scored two goals in 148 total appearances which included four in the 2010–11 UEFA Europa League.

After spending time on trial at Derry City, Price signed for Bohemians just in time for the 2011 season. He made his league debut for his new club against Bray Wanderers on 4 March at the Carlisle Grounds.

Price signed for Dublin rivals St.Patrick's Athletic for the 2012 season after a very impressive season with Bohemians. Price was injured for the entire of pre-season as he recovered from an operation on his foot for an injury sustained in his last game for Bohemians away to Derry City, so he spent up until May regaining his fitness. Price played his first game for Pats on 7 May against one of his old clubs Shamrock Rovers in the Leinater Senior Cup quarter-final at Tallaght Stadium. Although the Saints lost 3–0, Price had an impressive game and he added great experience to a very young team made up mostly of the clubs under 19 team. Ironically, Price's next game came yet again against Shamrock Rovers in yet another cup quarter final, this time the EA Sports Cup quarter final at Richmond Park on 26 June. This time around, Price was surrounded by many starting players for the Saints and he had an excellent game, putting in great tackles and blocks and staying very calm on the ball before coming off after 78 minutes.

On 27 November it was confirmed that Price will return to Bohemians for the 2014 season.

Honours

Club
Shamrock Rovers
 League of Ireland (1): 2010
 League of Ireland First Division (1): 2006

St Patrick's Athletic
 League of Ireland (1): 2013

Individual
 Shamrock Rovers Player of the Year (1): 2006

References

1981 births
Living people
Association footballers from County Dublin
Republic of Ireland association footballers
Association football defenders
Kilkenny City A.F.C. players
Shamrock Rovers F.C. players
League of Ireland players
Bohemian F.C. players
St Patrick's Athletic F.C. players
Limerick F.C. players
League of Ireland XI players
Cherry Orchard F.C. players